The APG system (Angiosperm Phylogeny Group system) of plant classification is the first version of a modern, mostly molecular-based, system of plant taxonomy. Published in 1998 by the Angiosperm Phylogeny Group, it was replaced by the improved APG II in 2003, APG III system in 2009 and APG IV system in 2016.

History
The original APG system is unusual in being based, not on total evidence, but on the cladistic analysis of the DNA sequences of three genes, two chloroplast genes and one gene coding for ribosomes.  Although based on molecular evidence only, its constituent groups prove to be supported by other evidence as well, for example pollen morphology supports the split between the eudicots and the rest of the former dicotyledons.

The system is rather controversial in its decisions at the family level, splitting a number of long-established families and submerging some other families.  It also is unusual in not using botanical names above the level of order, that is, an order is the highest rank that will have a formal botanical name in this system.  Higher groups are defined only as clades, with names such as monocots, eudicots, rosids, asterids.

The APG system was superseded in 2003 by a revision, the APG II system, in 2009 by a next revision, the APG III system, and then in 2016 by a further revision, the APG IV system.

Groups

The main groups in the system (all unranked clades) are:

angiosperms :
monocots
commelinoids
eudicots
core eudicots
rosids
eurosids I
eurosids II
asterids
euasterids I
euasterids II

Representation in color

The APG system recognises 462 families and 40 orders: these are assigned as follows. In the beginning of each listing some families or orders that are not placed in a further clade:

 clade angiosperms
 family Amborellaceae
 family Austrobaileyaceae
 family Canellaceae
 family Chloranthaceae
 family Hydnoraceae
 family Illiciaceae
 family Nymphaeaceae [+ family Cabombaceae]
 family Rafflesiaceae
 family Schisandraceae
 family Trimeniaceae
 family Winteraceae
 order Ceratophyllales
 family Ceratophyllaceae
 order Laurales
 family Atherospermataceae
 family Calycanthaceae
 family Gomortegaceae
 family Hernandiaceae
 family Lauraceae
 family Monimiaceae
 family Siparunaceae
 order Magnoliales
 family Annonaceae
 family Degeneriaceae
 family Eupomatiaceae
 family Himantandraceae
 family Magnoliaceae
 family Myristicaceae
 order Piperales
 family Aristolochiaceae
 family Lactoridaceae
 family Piperaceae
 family Saururaceae
 clade monocots
 family Corsiaceae
 family Japonoliriaceae
 family Nartheciaceae
 family Petrosaviaceae
 family Triuridaceae
 order Acorales
 family Acoraceae
 order Alismatales
 family Alismataceae
 family Aponogetonaceae
 family Araceae
 family Butomaceae
 family Cymodoceaceae
 family Hydrocharitaceae
 family Juncaginaceae
 family Limnocharitaceae
 family Posidoniaceae
 family Potamogetonaceae
 family Ruppiaceae
 family Scheuchzeriaceae
 family Tofieldiaceae
 family Zosteraceae
 order Asparagales
 family Agapanthaceae
 family Agavaceae
 family Alliaceae
 family Amaryllidaceae
 family Anemarrhenaceae
 family Anthericaceae
 family Aphyllanthaceae
 family Asparagaceae
 family Asphodelaceae
 family Asteliaceae
 family Behniaceae
 family Blandfordiaceae
 family Boryaceae
 family Convallariaceae
 family Doryanthaceae
 family Hemerocallidaceae
 family Herreriaceae
 family Hesperocallidaceae
 family Hyacinthaceae
 family Hypoxidaceae
 family Iridaceae
 family Ixioliriaceae
 family Lanariaceae
 family Laxmanniaceae
 family Orchidaceae
 family Tecophilaeaceae
 family Themidaceae
 family Xanthorrhoeaceae
 family Xeronemataceae
 order Dioscoreales
 family Burmanniaceae
 family Dioscoreaceae
 family Taccaceae
 family Thismiaceae
 family Trichopodaceae
 order Liliales
 family Alstroemeriaceae
 family Campynemataceae
 family Colchicaceae
 family Liliaceae
 family Luzuriagaceae
 family Melanthiaceae
 family Philesiaceae
 family Ripogonaceae
 family Smilacaceae
 order Pandanales
 family Cyclanthaceae
 family Pandanaceae
 family Stemonaceae
 family Velloziaceae
clade commelinoids
 family Abolbodaceae
 family Bromeliaceae
 family Dasypogonaceae
 family Hanguanaceae
 family Mayacaceae
 family Rapateaceae
 order Arecales
 family Arecaceae
 order Commelinales
 family Commelinaceae
 family Haemodoraceae
 family Philydraceae
 family Pontederiaceae
 order Poales
 family Anarthriaceae
 family Centrolepidaceae
 family Cyperaceae
 family Ecdeiocoleaceae
 family Eriocaulaceae
 family Flagellariaceae
 family Hydatellaceae
 family Joinvilleaceae
 family Juncaceae
 family Poaceae
 family Prioniaceae
 family Restionaceae
 family Sparganiaceae
 family Thurniaceae
 family Typhaceae
 family Xyridaceae
 order Zingiberales
 family Cannaceae
 family Costaceae
 family Heliconiaceae
 family Lowiaceae
 family Marantaceae
 family Musaceae
 family Strelitziaceae
 family Zingiberaceae
 clade eudicots
 family Buxaceae
 family Didymelaceae
 family Sabiaceae
 family Trochodendraceae [+ family Tetracentraceae]
 order Proteales
 family Nelumbonaceae
 family Platanaceae
 family Proteaceae
 order Ranunculales
 family Berberidaceae
 family Circaeasteraceae [+ family Kingdoniaceae]
 family Eupteleaceae
 family Lardizabalaceae
 family Menispermaceae
 family Papaveraceae [+ family Fumariaceae and family Pteridophyllaceae]
 family Ranunculaceae
 clade core eudicots
 family Aextoxicaceae
 family Berberidopsidaceae
 family Dilleniaceae
 family Gunneraceae
 family Myrothamnaceae
 family Vitaceae
 order Caryophyllales
 family Achatocarpaceae
 family Aizoaceae
 family Amaranthaceae
 family Ancistrocladaceae
 family Asteropeiaceae
 family Basellaceae
 family Cactaceae
 family Caryophyllaceae
 family Didiereaceae
 family Dioncophyllaceae
 family Droseraceae
 family Drosophyllaceae
 family Frankeniaceae
 family Molluginaceae
 family Nepenthaceae
 family Nyctaginaceae
 family Physenaceae
 family Phytolaccaceae
 family Plumbaginaceae
 family Polygonaceae
 family Portulacaceae
 family Rhabdodendraceae
 family Sarcobataceae
 family Simmondsiaceae
 family Stegnospermataceae
 family Tamaricaceae
 order Santalales
 family Olacaceae
 family Opiliaceae
 family Loranthaceae
 family Misodendraceae
 family Santalaceae
 order Saxifragales
 family Altingiaceae
 family Cercidiphyllaceae
 family Crassulaceae
 family Daphniphyllaceae
 family Grossulariaceae
 family Haloragaceae
 family Hamamelidaceae
 family Iteaceae
 family Paeoniaceae
 family Penthoraceae
 family Pterostemonaceae
 family Saxifragaceae
 family Tetracarpaeaceae
 clade rosids
 family Aphloiaceae
 family Crossosomataceae
 family Ixerbaceae
 family Krameriaceae
 family Picramniaceae
 family Podostemaceae
 family Stachyuraceae
 family Staphyleaceae
 family Tristichaceae
 family Zygophyllaceae
 order Geraniales
 family Francoaceae
 family Geraniaceae [+ family Hypseocharitaceae]
 family Greyiaceae
 family Ledocarpaceae
 family Melianthaceae
 family Vivianiaceae
 clade eurosids I
 family Celastraceae
 family Huaceae
 family Parnassiaceae [+ family Lepuropetalaceae]
 family Stackhousiaceae
 order Cucurbitales
 family Anisophylleaceae
 family Begoniaceae
 family Coriariaceae
 family Corynocarpaceae
 family Cucurbitaceae
 family Datiscaceae
 family Tetramelaceae
 order Fabales
 family Fabaceae
 family Polygalaceae
 family Quillajaceae
 family Surianaceae
 order Fagales
 family Betulaceae
 family Casuarinaceae
 family Fagaceae
 family Juglandaceae
 family Myricaceae
 family Nothofagaceae
 family Rhoipteleaceae
 family Ticodendraceae
 order Malpighiales
 family Achariaceae
 family Balanopaceae
 family Caryocaraceae
 family Chrysobalanaceae
 family Clusiaceae
 family Dichapetalaceae
 family Erythroxylaceae
 family Euphorbiaceae
 family Euphroniaceae
 family Flacourtiaceae
 family Goupiaceae
 family Hugoniaceae
 family Humiriaceae
 family Irvingiaceae
 family Ixonanthaceae
 family Lacistemaceae
 family Linaceae
 family Malesherbiaceae
 family Malpighiaceae
 family Medusagynaceae
 family Ochnaceae
 family Pandaceae
 family Passifloraceae
 family Putranjivaceae
 family Quiinaceae
 family Rhizophoraceae
 family Salicaceae
 family Scyphostegiaceae
 family Trigoniaceae
 family Turneraceae
 family Violaceae
 order Oxalidales
 family Cephalotaceae
 family Connaraceae
 family Cunoniaceae
 family Elaeocarpaceae
 family Oxalidaceae
 family Tremandraceae
 order Rosales
 family Barbeyaceae
 family Cannabaceae
 family Cecropiaceae
 family Celtidaceae
 family Dirachmaceae
 family Elaeagnaceae
 family Moraceae
 family Rhamnaceae
 family Rosaceae
 family Ulmaceae
 family Urticaceae
 clade eurosids II
 family Tapisciaceae
 order Brassicales
 family Akaniaceae [+ family Bretschneideraceae]
 family Bataceae
 family Brassicaceae
 family Caricaceae
 family Emblingiaceae
 family Gyrostemonaceae
 family Koeberliniaceae
 family Limnanthaceae
 family Moringaceae
 family Pentadiplandraceae
 family Resedaceae
 family Salvadoraceae
 family Setchellanthaceae
 family Tovariaceae
 family Tropaeolaceae
 order Malvales
 family Bixaceae  [+ family Diegodendraceae]
 family Cistaceae
 family Cochlospermaceae
 family Dipterocarpaceae
 family Malvaceae
 family Muntingiaceae
 family Neuradaceae
 family Sarcolaenaceae
 family Sphaerosepalaceae
 family Thymelaeaceae
 order Myrtales
 family Alzateaceae
 family Combretaceae
 family Crypteroniaceae
 family Heteropyxidaceae
 family Lythraceae
 family Melastomataceae
 family Memecylaceae
 family Myrtaceae
 family Oliniaceae
 family Onagraceae
 family Penaeaceae
 family Psiloxylaceae
 family Rhynchocalycaceae
 family Vochysiaceae
 order Sapindales
 family Anacardiaceae
 family Biebersteiniaceae
 family Burseraceae
 family Kirkiaceae
 family Meliaceae
 family Nitrariaceae [+ family Peganaceae]
 family Rutaceae
 family Sapindaceae
 family Simaroubaceae
 clade asterids
 order Cornales
 family Cornaceae [+ family Nyssaceae]
 family Grubbiaceae
 family Hydrangeaceae
 family Hydrostachyaceae
 family Loasaceae
 order Ericales
 family Actinidiaceae
 family Balsaminaceae
 family Clethraceae
 family Cyrillaceae
 family Diapensiaceae
 family Ebenaceae
 family Ericaceae
 family Fouquieriaceae
 family Halesiaceae
 family Lecythidaceae
 family Marcgraviaceae
 family Myrsinaceae
 family Pellicieraceae
 family Polemoniaceae
 family Primulaceae
 family Roridulaceae
 family Sapotaceae
 family Sarraceniaceae
 family Styracaceae
 family Symplocaceae
 family Ternstroemiaceae
 family Tetrameristaceae
 family Theaceae
 family Theophrastaceae
 clade euasterids I
 family Boraginaceae
 family Plocospermataceae
 family Vahliaceae
 order Garryales
 family Aucubaceae
 family Eucommiaceae
 family Garryaceae
 family Oncothecaceae
 order Gentianales
 family Apocynaceae
 family Gelsemiaceae
 family Gentianaceae
 family Loganiaceae
 family Rubiaceae
 order Lamiales
 family Acanthaceae
 family Avicenniaceae
 family Bignoniaceae
 family Buddlejaceae
 family Byblidaceae
 family Cyclocheilaceae
 family Gesneriaceae
 family Lamiaceae
 family Lentibulariaceae
 family Myoporaceae
 family Oleaceae
 family Orobanchaceae
 family Paulowniaceae
 family Pedaliaceae [+ family Martyniaceae]
 family Phrymaceae
 family Plantaginaceae
 family Schlegeliaceae
 family Scrophulariaceae
 family Stilbaceae
 family Tetrachondraceae
 family Verbenaceae
 order Solanales
 family Convolvulaceae
 family Hydroleaceae
 family Montiniaceae
 family Solanaceae
 family Sphenocleaceae
 clade euasterids II
 family Adoxaceae
 family Bruniaceae
 family Carlemanniaceae
 family Columelliaceae [+ family Desfontainiaceae]
 family Eremosynaceae
 family Escalloniaceae
 family Icacinaceae
 family Polyosmaceae
 family Sphenostemonaceae
 family Tribelaceae
 order Apiales
 family Apiaceae
 family Araliaceae
 family Aralidiaceae
 family Griseliniaceae
 family Melanophyllaceae
 family Pittosporaceae
 family Torricelliaceae
 order Aquifoliales
 family Aquifoliaceae
 family Helwingiaceae
 family Phyllonomaceae
 order Asterales
 family Alseuosmiaceae
 family Argophyllaceae
 family Asteraceae
 family Calyceraceae
 family Campanulaceae [+ family Lobeliaceae]
 family Carpodetaceae
 family Donatiaceae
 family Goodeniaceae
 family Menyanthaceae
 family Pentaphragmataceae
 family Phellinaceae
 family Rousseaceae
 family Stylidiaceae
 order Dipsacales
 family Caprifoliaceae
 family Diervillaceae
 family Dipsacaceae
 family Linnaeaceae
 family Morinaceae
 family Valerianaceae

Note: "+ ..." = optional seggregrate family, that may be split off from the preceding family.

 Families of uncertain position
 family Balanophoraceae
 family Bonnetiaceae
 family Cardiopteridaceae
 family Ctenolophonaceae
 family Cynomoriaceae
 family Cytinaceae
 family Dipentodontaceae
 family Elatinaceae
 family Geissolomataceae
 family Hoplestigmataceae
 family Kaliphoraceae
 family Lepidobotryaceae
 family Lissocarpaceae
 family Lophopyxidaceae
 family Medusandraceae
 family Metteniusaceae
 family Mitrastemonaceae
 family Paracryphiaceae
 family Pentaphylacaceae
 family Peridiscaceae
 family Plagiopteraceae
 family Pottingeriaceae
 family Sladeniaceae
 family Strasburgeriaceae
 family Tepuianthaceae

See also
 APG II system
 APG III system
 APG IV system

References
  (Available online: (PDF))

External links 
 Comparison with other systems at CSDL, Texas
 APG on the Hamburg server

APG 01

1998 in science
1998 introductions
Angiosperm Phylogeny Group